Koyal is a Pakistani television series first aired on Aaj Entertainment on 9 December 2021. The story is written by Zanjabeel Asim Shah and directed by Yasir Hussain in his directorial debut. It features Mansha Pasha and Fahad Shaikh in leading roles. The story revolves around the rivalry of two sisters.

Cast 
 Mansha Pasha as Koyal
 Fahad Shaikh as Moosa
 Noor ul Hassan as Affaq Ahmed
 Huma Mir as Nargis 
 Maham Amir as Pakiza
 Fareeha Jabeen as Falak
 Faysal Shahzad  as Mahir
 Syeda Kainat as Mashal
 Sajeel Meer as Affan 
 Saman Malik as Ishrat
 Umer Aalam as Hashim

Plot 

Koyal or Cuckoo is about childhood trauma and revenge, and it also shows how a name impacts your personality. Koyal (Mansha Pasha) was an adopted child of Affaq, her father Affaq loved her a lot but her siblings always disowned and ignored her. When she grew up her only target was to take revenge on everyone who was included in destroying her childhood. Koyal started to act innocent and torture everyone around, to make it more traumatizing she puts all the blame on her siblings specially Pakiza (Maham Amir). 
The drama also has the deep meaning of "Koyal" a bird who takes possession of another bird's nest and slowly starts killing the nest's original birds.

Production 
The project was first announced by Hussain on his social media handle in late July 2021 While talking to Dawn Images, Hussain revealed, "the story is about a koel who gives her eggs in someone else's nest." He revealed that Pasha will be an adopted child, and Huma Mir, who will be on screen after a 12-year gap, will be playing her mother in the series. The first look of the series was unveiled by Hussain on 3 November 2021 through his Instagram account.

Citations 

Pakistani television series
2021 Pakistani television series debuts
Urdu-language television shows